Ema Derossi-Bjelajac (3 May 1926 – 20 June 2020) was a Croatian politician who served as the President of the Presidency of the Socialist Republic of Croatia (a constituent republic of the Socialist Federal Republic of Yugoslavia) from 1985 until 1986. She was the first woman to hold a title equivalent to a head of state in modern-day Croatia.

Biography
She served in a number of high-ranking functions within the League of Communists of Croatia and the Croatian republican government of the period: notably, she was a Member of the Central Committee of the League between 1964 and 1974, and was a Member and Deputy Speaker of the Croatian Parliament (Sabor) between 1978 and 1982. She served in the Central Committee of the League of Communists of Yugoslavia from 1964 to 1968.

On 20 June 2020, she died in Zagreb, aged 94.

References

Sources
DEROSSI-BJELAJAC, Ema at lzmk.hr 

Central Committee of the League of Communists of Yugoslavia members
League of Communists of Croatia politicians
Presidency of the Socialist Republic of Croatia members
20th-century Croatian women politicians
20th-century Croatian politicians
1926 births
2020 deaths
People from Labin